Peterboro, located approximately  southeast of Syracuse, New York, is a historic hamlet and currently the administrative center for the Town of Smithfield, Madison County, New York, United States. Peterboro has a Post Office, ZIP code 13134.

Because of its most famous resident—businessman, philanthropist, and public intellectual Gerrit Smith—Peterboro was before the U.S. Civil War the capital of the U.S. abolition movement. Peterboro was, according to Rev. Henry Highland Garnet,  the only place in the country where fugitive slave catchers did not dare show their faces, the only place the New York Anti-Slavery Society could meet (a mob chased it out of Utica), the only place where fugitive slaves ever met as a group—the Fugitive Slave Convention of 1850, held in neighboring Cazenovia because Peterboro was too small for the expected crowd. Abolitionist leaders such as John Brown, Frederick Douglass, Harriet Tubman, and many others were constant guests in Smith's house. So many fugitive slaves headed for Peterboro, and Smith, that there is a book about them, and some never left Peterboro, forming a Black community from an early date.

Here is the comment of a minister, visiting in 1841:

According to abolitionist Julia Griffiths:

This was not true elsewhere in Madison County.

In the 1850 census, the population of Peterboro was 347. In 1859 there were two drug stores, a tailor's shop, two groceries, a country dry goods store, the Peterboro Academy, the Fay House (a hotel), and the closed Peterboro Hotel.

The Town Hall, in a former Presbyterian church, houses the National Abolition Hall of Fame and Museum. Gerrit Smith's mansion was lost to fire in 1936, but his office, the Peterboro Land Office, has survived. A Peterboro Area Museum is located in the former schoolhouse of the Home for Destitute Children of Madison County; in 2022 it is open only on Sundays.

Founding 
In 1795, Peter Smith Sr., a partner of John Jacob Astor's who built his fortune in the fur trade, founded Peterborough, naming the town after himself. Smith moved his family to Peterborough in 1804 and built the family home there, in what at the time was near-wilderness. His son Gerrit changed the spelling of the name to Peterboro.

Notable people

Gerrit Smith
In the 1820s, Gerrit Smith took over the business interests of his father, Peter Smith Sr., managing his family's property holdings in the town and the surrounding area. The Peterboro Land Office—the most important surviving building of the Smith estate—was built as his office for these activities.

Gerrit Smith's commitment to both the abolition and temperance movements led to the Smith estate in Peterboro becoming a stop on the underground railroad. Less successful was Smith's temperance campaign, which did not enjoy local support; he built one of the first temperance hotels in the country in Peterboro, but it was not commercially successful.

He was reported to be liked by almost all the people of Peterboro. "He does a vast deal of good here." After John Brown's raid, when Smith expected to be indicted, the people of Peterboro were prepared to use force (guns) to prevent his arrest.

Others 
 Ann Carroll Fitzhugh, Smith's wife..
 Elizabeth Smith Miller, Smith's daughter, the first to wear bloomers.
 Gerrit Smith Miller, Smith's grandson.
 Gerrit Smith Miller, Jr., Smith's great-grandson.
 Rev. Henry Highland Garnet, a Black minister and abolitionist.
 Elizabeth Cady Stanton, a founder of the women's rights movement and first cousin of Gerrit Smith on his mother's side, met her husband, Henry B. Stanton, at the Smith home in 1839. He had come from Utica to Peterboro to speak. Attending abolition meetings in Madison County, she wrote, "I shall never forget those charming drives over the hills in Madison County, the bright autumnal days, and the bewitching moonlight nights. The enthusiasm of the people in these great meetings, the thrilling oratory and lucid argument of the speakers, all conspired to make these days memorable as among the most charming in my life."
 George Pack, his wife Maria Lathrop, and family resided in Peterboro in the late 1830s and early 1840s. From Peterboro, Pack went on to Michigan's Lower Peninsula, where he founded the family's business interests in timber. Pack's son, George Willis Pack, who was born in Peterboro, and grandson, Charles Lathrop Pack, both became well-known timbermen in their own right.
 Alexander Preston Ellinwood, Wisconsin politician, teacher, and businessman, was born in Peterboro.

Historic sites 
In 2001, the Gerrit Smith Estate was designated a National Historic Landmark.
 The Peterboro Land Office building and Smithfield Presbyterian Church, now the Smithfield Town Hall,   are listed on the National Register of Historic Places.
 The Church of Peterboro, at Park Street and Swamp Road, founded in 1843 by Gerrit Smith, in the 20th century became a private dwelling.  Among those that spoke there were Frederick Douglass, William Lloyd Garrison, Sojourner Truth, and Harriet Tubman.

See also 
 Fugitive Slave Convention (Cazenovia, New York)
 National Abolition Hall of Fame and Museum
 Peterboro Area Museum
 Peterborough (disambiguation)

References

Further reading
Nolan, David. 1984. Fifty Feet in Paradise: The Booming of Florida. Harcourt Brace Jovanovich. (About Gen. Peter Sken Smith of Peterboro, brother of Gerrit Smith.)

External links

The Gerrit Smith Estate National Historic Landmark
New York Stops on the Underground Railroad
Historic Petersboro on the NYHistory.com website

 
Hamlets in New York (state)
Populated places on the Underground Railroad
Populated places established in 1795
Hamlets in Madison County, New York
1795 establishments in New York (state)
Abolitionism in the United States
Gerrit Smith